The Bowie Baysox are a Minor League Baseball team located in Bowie, Maryland. They are the Double-A affiliate of the Baltimore Orioles, and play in the Eastern League. Their home ballpark is Prince George's Stadium.

History
From 1989 to 1992, the Orioles' Double-A affiliate was located in Hagerstown, Maryland and called the Suns. When Major League Baseball added two teams in 1993, bids were offered for two new Triple-A franchises, and the Maryland Baseball Limited Partnership (which owned the Suns and also the Advanced-A Frederick Keys) got into the running to put one of the new franchises in central Maryland. Although their bid fell short, the idea of having a team in Bowie was so well-received that the MBLP decided to move the Double-A team across the state from Hagerstown. The Suns, meanwhile, were dropped to Low-A status.

A contest was held among the community to choose a new name for the team, and over 3,500 suggestions poured in. "Baysox" was chosen over the other finalists, which were "BayBirds" and "Nationals" (the latter was chosen for the nearby Washington major-league team when it moved to the area in 2005). The "Bay" references are to the Chesapeake Bay, which lies less than 20 miles to the east of Bowie.

A complex land deal hindered completion of the stadium, and in their inaugural season in 1993, the Baysox were forced to find an alternate site to play their home games. Eventually, a deal was reached that gave them Memorial Stadium in Baltimore, which had been vacated a year earlier when the Orioles moved into Camden Yards. A harsh winter prevented the new stadium from being completed in time for the beginning of the 1994 season, and the Baysox played 31 games that year at four other ballparks, including the University of Maryland and the Naval Academy. Finally, the Baysox moved into their permanent home on June 16, 1994.

After two losing seasons, the Baysox made it back to the playoffs in 1997, and were also named the top double-A franchise in America, in part because of their tremendous attendance figures despite their proximity to the Baltimore major-league market. Also in 1997 (June 28), the team introduced "Louie", its green furry mascot with pink hair and long snout, but unknown species. It is believed his design is modeled off of Chessie (sea monster) due to the team's name referencing the Chesapeake Bay. He continues to serve as mayor of "Louieville, Maryland", a play on the real city of Louisville, Kentucky, and also a rhyme to the team's home of Bowie.

The Baysox hosted the Double-A All-Star Game on July 12, 2000, bringing players from not only the Eastern League, but also the Southern and Texas leagues to Bowie. During that season, the Baysox also got a new owner, as the Maryland Baseball Partnership sold the team (along with the Frederick Keys and Delmarva Shorebirds) to the Comcast cable network.

The Baysox were again sold in October 2006 by Comcast Spectacor to Maryland Baseball Holding, LLC. A group headed by Ken Young, who is president of Ovations Food Service and also the owner of the Norfolk Tides, the Triple-A affiliate of the Baltimore Orioles and the Albuquerque Isotopes, the Triple-A affiliate of the Florida Marlins.

The Baysox went six straight seasons (1998–2003) without posting a winning record. In 2005, the team was in contention for the last playoff spot at the end of the season, but lost four straight games to Altoona on the final weekend to just miss the postseason once again. They won their first regular-season division championship in 2008, but lost to the Akron Aeros 3-1 in the Division Series.

The Baysox captured its first Eastern League Championship in 2015 with a 3–2 series victory over the Reading Fightin Phils. Its 79–63 regular season finish earned the ballclub its second-ever division title by five games over Altoona. The 3–1 Divisional Series win over the Curve sent Bowie to its first championship series in six attempts. One of the team's stars was Trey Mancini, who hit .359 for the season but fell 29 plate appearances short of the 384 needed to qualify for the league batting title due to his having been promoted to the team in June.

After a 19–35 start, the 2019 Baysox won 11 of 14 matches to conclude the first half in fourth place at 30–38. The momentum propelled them to a 46–26 record and the EL Western Division second-half title. Buck Britton was rewarded for the turnaround by being named EL Manager of the Year. The Baysox won the Western Division over the Harrisburg Senators but lost the Championship Series to the Trenton Thunder, with both postseason series finishing 3–1.

In conjunction with Major League Baseball's restructuring of Minor League Baseball in 2021, the Baysox were organized into the Double-A Northeast.

In 2021, The Baysox finished second in the Double-A Northeast League with a 73–47 record. This qualified them for the Double-A Northeast finals against the Akron RubberDucks. It was the third time Bowie has qualified for the playoffs in their history, and the third time since 2015. They lost the best-of-five series versus Akron, 3–0. Grayson Rodriguez was selected as the 2021 Double-A Northeast Pitcher of the Year and Adley Rutschman as the league's Top MLB Prospect.

The Baysox were purchased from Maryland Baseball Holding, LLC by Attain Sports and Entertainment in January 2022. In 2022, the Double-A Northeast became known as the Eastern League, the name historically used by the regional circuit prior to the 2021 reorganization.

Media
, Baysox games are streamed audio only on their Facebook, Twitter, and YouTube accounts. Adam Pohl and Paul Fritschner share broadcasting duties. Pohl has been with the team since 2014, while Fritschner joined in 2021.

Previously, Baysox games were carried live by radio station WNAV. In 2019, 40 games were broadcast live on the radio, and all games were streamed live on the station's website.

Promotions
On "Office Space night", fans, for a $1 fee, are able to live out the famous Office Space moment by destroying office equipment with a baseball bat.

On July 9, 2010, the fourth annual Autism Awareness Night took place at Prince George's Stadium. Fans that bought the Autism Awareness ticket had $3 of their ticket price donated to an autism charity of their choosing. Fans also took part in "Bowie's Largest Pillow Fight", which took place on the field following the game.

In 2016, the Baysox had a David Bowie night where the team temporarily renamed itself from the Bowie Baysox to the Bowie (bowh-wy) Baysox. The jerseys were designed to look like similar outfits that he wore with his Ziggy Stardust persona. The team also played his songs during the game. They have events many nights, including fireworks.

One of the most popular promotions is Star Wars night. Characters such as Chewbacca and R2-D2 are available to meet and take pictures with, and a fireworks show set to music from the series follows the game.

The Baysox also hosts an annual Navy Night, with the plebes from the United States Naval Academy attending the game. After the game, a postgame fireworks show takes place set to patriotic music.

Roster

Season records

Playoffs
 1993 season: Lost to Canton–Akron, 3–2 in first round
 1994 season: Lost to Harrisburg, 3–2 in first round
 1997 season: Lost to Harrisburg, 3–2 in first round
 2008 season: Lost to Akron, 3–1 in first round
 2012 season: Lost to Akron, 3–2 in first round
 2015 season: Won vs Altoona, 3–1 in first round; won vs Reading, 3–2 in championship round
 2017 season: Lost to Altoona, 3–0 in first round.
 2019 season: Won vs Harrisburg, 3–1 in first round; lost to Trenton 3–1 in championship round
 2021 season: Lost to Akron, 3–0 in Double-A Northeast Championship Series

References

External links
 Official website

Baseball teams established in 1993
1993 establishments in Maryland
Eastern League (1938–present) teams
Professional baseball teams in Maryland
Bowie, Maryland
Baltimore Orioles minor league affiliates
Double-A Northeast teams